Only the Animals is a 2019 French drama film directed by Dominik Moll. It is based on the novel Seules les bêtes by Colin Niel.

Cast
Denis Ménochet as Michel
Laure Calamy as Alice
Damien Bonnard as Joseph
Nadia Tereszkiewicz as Marion
Bastien Bouillon as Cédric Vigier
Valeria Bruni Tedeschi as Evelyne Ducat
Jenny Bellay as Madame Calvet
Guy Roger N'Drin as Armand

Reception
The site's consensus states: "Deft direction and an expertly assembled ensemble further elevate Only the Animals' intelligent, absorbing mystery." On Metacritic, Only the Animals has a score of 69 out of a 100 based on 13 critics, indicating "generally favorable reviews".

Peter Bradshaw of The Guardian wrote "The film's constituent parts... interlock like the workings of an intricate and malign musical box, creating dashes of melodrama, erotic obsession and even soap opera, and all superbly performed". Wendy Ide of The Observer commented "This is film-making that really tests the elasticity of its story strands, but it largely manages to keep the audience from teetering into disbelief".

In Australia, the film was lauded by David Stratton of The Australian who praised the director, the "excellent cast" and the film's "intricately devised characters". Paul Byrnes of The Sydney Morning Herald called the film "[an] impressively deliberate and sober in style".

In the UK, Tom Robey of The Daily Telegraph wrote "An ingenious feat of narrative construction which leads us down the garden path then backtracks up it bit by bit". Across the border, in Ireland, Donald Clarke, a film critic for The Irish Times wrote "Jolts are not severe enough to derail a smooth-running machine, but you may like to take a few Dramamine before the last act begins".

In the United States, Robert Abele of the Los Angeles Times commented "Not an entirely humming machine, but one that's been well-oiled enough to make for an engrossing ride through some intriguing thickets of love, desire and deceit".

Manohla Dargis of The New York Times wrote "The multiple viewpoints are just a clever, self-satisfied device to deliver stale goods and familiar ugliness with a soupçon of glib class politics".

Mark Keizer of Variety said the film "doesn't ask you to keep up so much as it encourages you to sink into the mystery and go along for the ride". Jordan Mintzer of The Hollywood Reporter added that "[it] can be a bit low on suspense in [some] places, but [the film] remains intriguing enough to keep you guessing till the [very end]".

References

External links

2019 drama films
French drama films
2010s French films